Margaret Ellen Sawyer is a fictional character that appears in stories published by DC Comics, and has been a supporting character in both Superman and Batman comic books.

The character appeared in the live-action series Smallville, played by Jill Teed, and in the second and third seasons of the Arrowverse series Supergirl, played by Floriana Lima.

Publication history 
Maggie Sawyer first appeared in Superman (vol. 2) #4 and was created by John Byrne.

Fictional character biography 

Maggie was introduced in Superman (2nd series) in April 1987, as Captain Sawyer of the Metropolis Special Crimes Unit, a special branch of the Metropolis police force that handles superpowered menaces when Superman is unavailable. Maggie mostly replaced Inspector Henderson from the previous comics as Superman's main police contact.

She was added to the Superman canon following the 12-issue maxi-series Crisis on Infinite Earths and the 6-issue miniseries that rebooted the comics, The Man of Steel. She tries to prove the police force is more efficient than a vigilante in fighting crime, and so becomes a constant thorn in Superman's side during the early days of his career, even trying to apprehend him occasionally. Eventually, after being injured and saved by Superman during a terrorist plot, her attitude towards him warms up.

Later stories revealed that she originally came from Star City. She married fellow police officer James Sawyer, although she was uncertain about her own sexual identity, and they had a daughter named Jamie.
Maggie later came out as a lesbian. James divorced her and won sole custody of Jamie and he refused to let Maggie have any contact with their daughter. Maggie ultimately moved to Metropolis when the SCU position became available and she resumed relations with her family in later stories.
Maggie has been in a long-term relationship with Toby Raynes, a reporter for the Metropolis Star.

In Action Comics #600, Lex Luthor, then a corporate executive, met with Maggie to get her to stop investigating his activities. He tries to blackmail her with documentation regarding her sexuality. At that time, Maggie was not publicly known to be a lesbian; although some of her colleagues knew, any public disclosure could possibly have discredited her and tainted her career. When Luthor injures himself and flees the room (due to kryptonite poisoning from his ring), Maggie is tempted with taking the damaging evidence left behind on his desk. She opts to leave the file in Luthor's hands, explaining to Inspector Dan Turpin that she is no longer ashamed of who she is and will not allow anyone to use it against her.

Maggie has a close working relationship with Inspector Turpin, her second-in-command at the SCU. However, she originally had a strained professional relationship with Inspector Henderson. It was later revealed that Henderson simply disapproved that higher-ranking officers, such as Turpin, reported to her, a Captain. He resolves the situation by promoting her to Inspector when he becomes Commissioner during the Death of Superman storyline. In the aftermath, Sawyer becomes involved in a covert 'war' between Superman's allies and Project Cadmus, led by Paul Westfield, which had stolen Superman's body for their own ends.

Sawyer's close friendship with injured ex-police officer Eddie Walker is examined in flashback as Walker becomes the hero Loose Cannon.

Metropolis S.C.U. 
Inspector Sawyer is the main character in the four-issue limited series comic title Metropolis SCU written by Cindy Goff, penciled by Peter Krause and inked by Jose Marzan Jr., which was published from November 1994 to February 1995.  The series features Lois Lane joining the S.C.U. to gain a deeper understanding of their operations.  Meanwhile, a rogue scientist attempts to destroy the Earth via lasers from space.

For this miniseries appearance the character of Maggie Sawyer received the 7th Outstanding Comic Strip GLAAD Media Awards in March 1996. The description featured in actual award delivered to DC editorial explained the actual honor:

MAGGIE SAWYER, SPECIAL CRIMES UNIT: A four-part series, Maggie Sawyer is the first by a major comic book publisher (DC Comics) to feature a heroine who is an out lesbian. The series follows Sawyer's exploits as Captain of the Metropolitan Special Crimes Unit as well as her personal life with her lover and her daughter.

Batman: No Man's Land 
In mid-2000s comics, Maggie has been transferred to Gotham City's police force as the head of the Major Crimes Unit, and is a significant character in the comic Gotham Central. The move has placed some strain on her relationship, since Toby did not follow her to Gotham.

Following the events of Infinite Crisis, Harvey Bullock discovers corruption in the GCPD apparently all the way up to Commissioner Michael Akins. In the end, James Gordon returns to his former position as commissioner. Maggie Sawyer, however, does not appear to be involved and is still a Captain.

52 
Maggie appeared in the series 52.

In Week Three, she arrives to a scene to find the body of Alex Luthor. She calls in Steel to ID the body, when Lex Luthor comes in with the press and announces that Alex was the one responsible for all of Luthor's wrongdoings.

In conversation, former detective Renee Montoya makes a reference to Toby Raines.

In Week Twelve, Maggie yells at Montoya for busting up a cover for Intergang, closing all leads to the criminal group in Gotham City.

Detective Comics 
Maggie appeared in Detective Comics #856 at a charity ball attended by Katherine "Kate" Kane.  While the two are dancing, Maggie mentions that she and Toby are no longer together and asks Kate for her phone number.

Batwoman 
Sawyer appears as a supporting character in the new Batwoman series launched in 2011 as part of The New 52 initiative. In that series she has begun dating Kate Kane, whose secret activities as Batwoman complicate their relationship. The prequel event Zero Year establishes she and Kate had first crossed paths when Maggie, as a Metropolis police officer, arrived in Gotham as backup support for an approaching hurricane; the two share a brief glance in precinct headquarters after Kate gets treatment for minor injuries she received while foiling a burglary during the storm. Kane reveals her identity as Batwoman by proposing to her in costume in Batwoman #17.

After Commissioner Jason Bard voluntarily resigns, Maggie is appointed in his place.  However, she ended up stepping down to return to the MCU, and has Gordon restored as Commissioner.

DC Rebirth 
During the DC Rebirth event, it is revealed that Maggie has transferred back to Metropolis PD in the first arc of the renumbered Action Comics series.

Alternate versions

DC Bombshells 
In the alternate universe of Bombshells, Maggie is again Batwoman's lover and helps hide her activities.

In other media

Television 
 In the 1990s animated TV show Superman: The Animated Series, Captain Maggie Sawyer (voiced by Joanna Cassidy) is paired with Metropolis Special Crimes Unit Dan Turpin. Her romantic partner Toby Raynes (voiced by Laraine Newman) is seen by Sawyer's bedside in several hospital scenes and later Turpin's funeral service in the two-part episode. Bruce Timm states in the commentary for "Tools of the Trade" that those scenes were the creators' way of acknowledging Sawyer's sexual orientation. She is later seen in background in the Justice League episode "Hereafter" attending Superman's funeral.
 A television series Smallville features actress Jill Teed playing the role of Lieutenant and later Detective Sawyer.
 Margarita "Maggie" Sawyer is introduced in season 2 of Supergirl, portrayed by Floriana Lima. She appears in a regular capacity as a member of the Science Police, or the National City Police Department's science division. Maggie later becomes romantically involved with Alex Danvers, Kara Danvers / Supergirl's adoptive sister. Maggie and Alex get engaged at the end of the season. Maggie returns in a recurring capacity in season 3. She attempts to reconnect with her father, who disowned her when she was a teenager because she was a lesbian. Although initially promising, the attempt fails when her father cannot come to terms with Maggie marrying another woman. Maggie manages to accept his disapproval and tells him that she doesn't need him anymore. Later, Maggie and Alex disagree about whether to have kids or not, as Alex wants kids and Maggie does not, and they break up, with Maggie telling Alex that she'll be a great mom when the time comes.

Film 
 Maggie Sawyer appears in The Death of Superman, voiced by Amanda Troop. This version is a police officer who works with Dan Turpin. Both are saved from Intergang by Superman at the film's beginning.

Video games 
 Maggie Sawyer appears in Superman: Shadow of Apokolips (2002), voiced by Joanna Cassidy.
 Maggie Sawyer appears in DC Universe Online, voiced by Lorrie Singer.
 In Batman: Arkham Knight, Maggie Sawyer is mentioned by Kate Kane on Bruce Wayne's voice mail during which Kate mentions her marriage to Maggie, revealing that the two are married in the Batman: Arkham series.
 Maggie Sawyer appears in Lego Dimensions voiced by Laura Bailey, but identified as a police officer.

See also 
 Homosexuality in the Batman franchise
 List of gay, lesbian, or bisexual figures in fiction and myth

References 

Batman characters
Characters created by John Byrne (comics)
Comics characters introduced in 1987
DC Comics female characters
DC Comics LGBT characters
Fictional police captains
Fictional lesbians
Fictional LGBT characters in television
GLAAD Media Award for Outstanding Comic Book winners
Gotham City Police Department officers
LGBT characters in animation
Metropolis Police Department officers
Superman characters